Joe Scanlan may refer to:
 Joe Scanlan (footballer)
 Joe Scanlan (artist)

See also
 Joseph L. Scanlan, American film and television director